Božidar (Bulgarian, Macedonian, sometimes transliterated as Bojidar, or Bozhidar) is a Slavic given name meaning "Divine gift". It is a calque of the Greek name Theodore, itself derived from the Greek word "Theodoros". Božo is a nickname form of Božidar. People with the name include:

Božidar Adžija (1890–1941), Yugoslav left-wing politician and journalist
Božidar "Boško" Antić (born 1944), Bosnian Serb striker
Božidar Antunović (born 1991), Serbian shot putter
Božidar Bandović (born 1969), Serbian football manager and former player
Božidar Beravs (born 1948), Slovenian ice hockey player
Bozidar Brazda (born 1972), artist, writer, and musician
Božidar Čačić (born 1972), Croatian retired football defender
Božidar Ćosić (born 1982), Serbian professional footballer
Božidar Debenjak (born 1935), Slovenian Marxist philosopher, social theorist and translator
Božidar Delić (born 1956), retired Yugoslav Army general, current vice president of Serbia
Božidar Đelić (born 1965), Serbian economist and politician
Božidar Drenovac, (1922–2003), Serbian football player and manager
Božidar Đurašković (born 1924), Yugoslav former middle distance runner
Božidar Đurković, (born 1972), retired Serbian football player
Božidar Ferjančić (1929–1998), Serbian historian
Božidar Finka (1925–1999), Croatian linguist and lexicographer
Božidar Grujović, pseudonym of Teodor Filipović (1778–1807), Serbian writer, jurist and educator
Bozidar Iskrenov (born 1962), former Bulgarian footballer
Božidar Ivanović (born 1946), Montenegrin Yugoslav chess grandmaster and politician 
Božidar Jakac (1899–1989), Slovene Expressionist, Realist and Symbolist painter
Božidar Janković (1849–1920), the Commander of the Serbian Third Army
Božidar Jelovac (born 1987), Serbian football forward
Božidar Jović (born 1972), retired Croatian handball player
Božidar Kalmeta (born 1958), Croatian politician
Božidar Kantušer (1921–1999), Slovene composer
Prince Božidar Karađorđević (1862–1908), Serbian artist and writer on art
Božidar Kavran (1913–?), Croatian Ustaše war criminal
Božidar Leiner (1919–1942), Croatian communist and Partisan
Božidar Maljković (born 1952), Serbian professional basketball coach
Božidar Matić (1937–2016), president of the Academy of Sciences and Arts of Bosnia and Herzegovina
Božidar "Boki" Milošević (1931–2018), Serbian clarinetist
Božidar Petranović (1809–1874), Serbian author, scholar, journalist, historian of Serbian literature
Božidar Purić (1891–1977), Serbian and Yugoslav politician and diplomat
Božidar Radošević (born 1989), Croatian footballer
Božidar Rašica (1912–1992), architect, scenographer and painter
Božidar Sandić (1922–2008), Serbian football player
Božidar Senčar (1927–1987), Croatian football midfielder
Božidar Širola (1889–1956), Croatian composer and musicologist
Božidar Špišić (1879–1957), Croatian orthopedist and rector of the University of Zagreb
Božidar Tadić (born 1983), Serbian footballer
Božidar Urošević (born 1975), Serbian professional football player
Božidar Vuković (1466–1540), one of the first printers of Serb books

See also
Edmund Bogdanowicz, pseudonym Bozydar
Slavic names
Bozar (disambiguation)
Bozdar
Bozhidar

Slavic masculine given names
Croatian masculine given names
Bulgarian masculine given names
Macedonian masculine given names
Montenegrin masculine given names
Serbian masculine given names
Slovene masculine given names